Several species of rodent have been newly identified in different parts of the world since 2000.

References 

Lists of animals described in the 21st century